The first season of American Dad! aired from February 6 to June 19, 2005, and consisted of seven episodes. The season is included within the Volume One DVD box set, which was released on April 25, 2006. Nineteen episodes were produced during the first production cycle with production numbers 1AJNxx. However, to continue running episodes for the full season (23 episodes) that began earlier than normal (May versus September) four episodes from the second production cycle (2AJNxx episodes) were aired.


Episode list

Extras

Reception
The season and series premiere, Pilot, aired following Super Bowl XXXIX. This premiere episode was broadcast as part of an animated television night on Fox, following an episode of The Simpsons. The episode was watched by 15.1 million viewers. In addition, the season was nominated for a Golden Reel Award for the episode "Homeland Insecurity".

Season one was met with mixed reviews. Certain critics commented positively on the season, such as DVD Fanatic, who graded the season a "B" rating. The website stated "the series may not be fully there yet, but it shows more promise than Futurama did in its first season", and listed "Homeland Insecurity", "Deacon Stan, Jesus Man", and "Stan of Arabia" as the "best episodes" of the season. IGN wrote a mixed review stating, "At its worst, American Dad! proves critics right – it is a lot like Family Guy. Stan is an idiot, Roger and Klaus are very similar to Stewie and Brian, and Francine acts as the voice of reason. Sure, there are differences, but there are plenty of moments when the characterizations are exactly the same. This isn't necessarily a bad thing, but if you're not a fan of Family Guy you might not be a huge fan of this show, either." However, the website believed the series showed improvement towards the end of the season, saying "once you get into the season, the show becomes downright hilarious, and the humor really detaches from Family Guy. It feels like it took some time for the writers to get used to not having the cutaways of Family Guy, and finally came to grips with the new format.", citing "Deacon Stan, Jesus Man" and "Bullocks to Stan" as the "best episodes" of the season. The opening sequence is shortened down to merely a short blip of the theme music playing over a picture of the flag in the Smiths' yard in "Bullocks to Stan" and "Stan of Arabia".

References
General
 

Specific

External links

 
2005 American television seasons